Stéphane Sessègnon (born 1 June 1984) is a Beninese professional footballer who plays for Sirens F.C. in the Maltese Premier League. He is a Benin international, having represented the nation at the 2008, 2010 and 2019 editions of the Africa Cup of Nations. Sessègnon plays a variety of positions as a forward, a winger and as a midfield offensive playmaker. He is Benin's all-time top scorer and appearance maker with 24 international goals in 83 matches.

Club career

Early career
Sessègnon began his career in Cotonou with Benin Premier League side Requins de l'Atlantique, which means the Sharks of the Atlantic in French. After spending only a year in the club's senior team, he moved to France to join Créteil, based in the Parisian suburbs, where he joined fellow international Noël Séka. Sessègnon made his debut on the opening match day of the 2004–05 Ligue 2 season against Stade Reims as a substitute in a 2–1 defeat. He scored his first goals on 14 January 2005, a brace in a span of four minutes, in a 3–0 win over Gueugnon. Though Créteil finished in 15th position, Sessègnon was labelled a revelation as he was the primary bright spot in helping the club escape relegation.

Le Mans
Keen on a move to Ligue 1, Sessègnon signed a three-year deal with Le Mans on 19 May 2006. He made his debut for the club in a league match against Troyes, appearing as a substitute in a 2–2 draw. After featuring as a substitute in his first five appearances, and receiving a straight red card in a match against Sedan, he earned his first start on 4 November 2006 against Auxerre. Two weeks later, he scored his first career goal for Le Mans in a 1–1 draw with Rennes.

Initially used as a holding midfielder at Le Mans, Sessègnon was given a more advanced role for the 2007–08 season, often starting on the right side of the midfield or as an attacker. In this new role, he scored both goals in the club's 3–2 defeat to giants Lyon on 1 September 2007. He scored again the following week in a 1–0 victory over Valenciennes. Sessègnon also helped the club reach the semi-finals of the Coupe de la Ligue that season although they lost to Lens in a thrilling 5–4 defeat in extra time, Sessègnon playing the entire 120 minutes.

Paris Saint-Germain

Due to his success at Le Mans, Sessègnon was scouted by larger clubs such as Premier League sides Arsenal and Newcastle United. However, he remained in France by signing a four-year deal with Paris Saint Germain. The fee was said to be in the range of €8–10 million.

Sessègnon made his league debut with the club on 16 August 2008, starting in the 1–0 win against Bordeaux. The following match day, he scored his first goal for PSG in a 1–1 draw with Sochaux. On 13 December 2008, Sessègnon scored his third career brace against Auxerre in a 2–1 victory. For his positive performances, he was named the UNFP Player of the Month for December. Sessègnon also appeared in nine matches in the UEFA Cup, scoring one goal against Dutch club Twente.

Several clubs contacted PSG in the off-season to discuss Sessègnon's availability, with Premier League clubs Chelsea, Liverpool, Arsenal, Everton and Manchester City being the primary suitors. Taking advantage of the considerable interest in him, Sessègnon issued a public demand on 23 June that his parent club give him a pay raise, stating, "I think I am one of the best performers in the club." The firing of PSG manager Paul Le Guen also played a role in his demands, and two weeks later, Sessègnon and the club reached an agreement on a contract extension with the player set to receive a substantial pay raise.

In the 2010–11 season, Sessègnon struggled to make an impact with the first team after manager Antoine Kombouaré relegated him to a substitute's role. Friction between player and manager reached its zenith in December 2010, when Sessègnon accused Kombouaré of insulting him during a one-on-one interview ahead of the team's match against Nancy on 19 December. Sessègnon subsequently confirmed his desire to leave the club in the January window and, as a sign of his intent, refused to join Paris Saint-Germain on its winter training camp in Morocco.

Sunderland

2010–11 season

On 29 January 2011, Sessègnon departed Paris Saint-Germain to join English club Sunderland. He signed a three-and-a-half-year contract and the transfer fee was priced at £6 million, and made his debut on 1 February against Chelsea. He made his second start for the Black Cats in 3–2 away loss against Stoke City on 5 February 2011. His first real successful moment as a Sunderland player after a disappointing start came on 23 April, where he scored his first goal for the club in the 4–2 win over Wigan Athletic. He converted a penalty of his own making in the 73rd minute, beating Ali Al-Habsi after being tripped by Antolín Alcaraz. Sessègnon had been forced to play in an unfamiliar role as a lone striker, after injuries to strikers Danny Welbeck and Asamoah Gyan during the match.

Sessègnon scored in Sunderland's home defeat against Wolverhampton Wanderers, and again in the final match of the season, a 0–3 win at West Ham United.

2011–12 season

In his second season at Sunderland, Sessègnon scored his first goal of the season against Bolton Wanderers on 22 October 2011. He followed this up with an 89th-minute equaliser against Aston Villa a week later, also providing an assist and winning man of the match.

On 8 February 2012, in a FA Cup fourth round replay, Sessègnon scored a dramatic late winner against Middlesbrough in the 113th minute during extra time to take Sunderland into the fifth round again Arsenal. On 4 March, he was sent-off in the match against Newcastle United for an elbow to the chest of Cheick Tioté, with Sunderland leading the Tyne-Wear derby 1–0. Newcastle went on to equalise in stoppage time. Sessègnon served a three-match ban returning to score the third goal in Sunderland's 3–1 win against Queens Park Rangers at the Stadium of Light on 24 March. Against Manchester City, although he did not score in the match, he set up two assists, one for a Sebastian Larsson opener in the 31st minute and the second for a Nicklas Bendtner header deep in the first half of injury time to make the match 2–1 for Sunderland at half time. The match finished in a 3–3 draw, with Larsson in the 55th minute scoring to put Sunderland 3–1 ahead after Sessègnon started that attack, then in the 85th minute, Mario Balotelli scored to make the score 3–2 and Aleksandar Kolarov scored Manchester City's equalising goal in the 86th. Sessègnon won the Player of the Season award for the season.

2012–13 season
On 30 August 2012, Sessègnon signed a new contract that would keep him at the Stadium of Light until 2015.

In Paolo Di Canio's second match as Sunderland manager, on 14 April 2013, Sessègnon scored against Sunderland's fiercest rivals Newcastle to put Sunderland 1–0 up. Sunderland went on to win the encounter with their rivals 3–0, with Sessègnon assisting David Vaughan for the third goal. The following week, Sessègnon scored the only goal as Sunderland defeated Everton 1–0 at home. His season ended prematurely after he was sent off during Sunderland's 6–1 defeat against Aston Villa. He played 2 games of the 2013–14 season, but due to a falling out with Paolo Di Canio and a drink driving incident, his time at the club was all but over.

West Bromwich Albion
On 2 September 2013, Sessègnon joined West Bromwich Albion for a club record fee of £5.5 million, rising to £6 million with extras. On 21 September, Sessègnon scored the first goal in a 3–0 win on his debut for West Bromwich Albion against Sunderland, his previous club. On 9 November, he scored against Chelsea in controversial 2–2 draw at Stamford Bridge. On 15 March 2014, Sessegnon scored the first Albion goal of a 1–2 away victory against Swansea City at the Liberty Stadium, helping Pepe Mel gain his first win as head coach. Sessègnon, thus far, has been a fan favourite at the club and his substitution in matches has often lead to a negative reaction from the fans. He scored his first goal of his second season at the club against Manchester United with a well-taken strike in a 2–2 draw at The Hawthorns.

After almost leaving the club at the end of the season after falling out with manager Tony Pulis over selection issues, Sessegnon would return to the first team in the 2015–16 season with consistent performances.

On 18 May 2016, it was announced that Sessègnon and Victor Anichebe would leave the club.

Montpellier
On 26 September 2016, Sessègnon signed for Ligue 1 side Montpellier on a two-year deal.

Gençlerbirliği
On 23 January 2018, Sessègnon signed a one and a half-year contract with Süper Lig side Gençlerbirliği.

Sirens F.C.
In the summer of 2022, Sirens F.C. of the Maltese Premier League managed to sign Stéphane Sessègnon.

International career
Sessègnon made his debut for Benin on 6 June 2004 in a 2006 World Cup qualification match against Cameroon starting in the team's 2–1 loss.

Sessègnon was the captain of Benin's successful 2019 Africa Cup of Nations campaign, where his side reached the quarter-finals.

Style of play
Upon signing for Sunderland, manager Steve Bruce described Sessègnon as a player who "can play on the left, on the right, through the middle – he's lightning quick and he's a match-winner." Bruce also went on to say, "Stéphane's a little powerhouse with a low centre of gravity, some great dribbling skills and a good shot."

Personal life
He is a distant cousin of twin brothers Ryan, who plays for Tottenham Hotspur and Steven, who plays for Fulham.

Career statistics

International

International goals
Scores and results list Benin's goal tally first.

Honours

Club
PSG
Coupe de France: 2009–10

International
Benin
 Ghana Four Nations Tournament (Friendly) runner-up: 2007

Individual
 Special Award for services to the national team

References

External links

 
 
 

1984 births
Living people
People from Allahé
Beninese footballers
Association football wingers
Requins de l'Atlantique FC players
US Créteil-Lusitanos players
Le Mans FC players
Paris Saint-Germain F.C. players
Sunderland A.F.C. players
West Bromwich Albion F.C. players
Montpellier HSC players
Gençlerbirliği S.K. footballers
Benin Premier League players
Ligue 2 players
Ligue 1 players
Premier League players
Süper Lig players
Benin international footballers
2008 Africa Cup of Nations players
2010 Africa Cup of Nations players
2019 Africa Cup of Nations players
Beninese expatriate footballers
Beninese expatriate sportspeople in France
Beninese expatriate sportspeople in England
Beninese expatriate sportspeople in Turkey
Expatriate footballers in France
Expatriate footballers in England
Expatriate footballers in Turkey